Piz Muragl is a mountain of the Livigno Alps, overlooking Pontresina in the canton of Graubünden. It lies on the range south of the Val Muragl.

References

External links
 Piz Muragl on Hikr

Mountains of the Alps
Mountains of Graubünden
Mountains of Switzerland